= Head of the OCHA Office, Central African Republic =

Post

The Head of the OCHA Office in Central African Republic is the highest post in the tiny African country for the United Nations Office for the Coordination of Humanitarian Affairs, nevertheless a key post in light of the country's current humanitarian emergency.

== List of Heads of the OCHA Office in CAR ==
- Souleymane Beye, May 2005 - December 2006
- Jean-Sebastien Munie, January 2007 - present
